Guillaume Jean Maxime Antoine Depardieu (7 April 1971 – 13 October 2008) was a French actor, winner of a César Award, and the oldest child of Gérard Depardieu.

Early life
Depardieu was the son of actor Gérard Depardieu and his first wife, actress Élisabeth Depardieu (née Guignot). He was the brother of actress Julie Depardieu, and half-brother of Roxane and Jean Depardieu.

Career
Guillaume shared the screen with his father several times throughout his career, beginning with his first film role, aged three, playing Gérard's son in Claude Goretta's That Wonderful Crook (Pas Si Méchant Que Ça) in 1974. His next appearance beside his father was in Tous les matins du monde in 1991, followed by Count of Monte Cristo in 1998, and Aime Ton Père (A Loving Father) in 2002. In 1996 he won a César Award (France's national film award) as the most promising newcomer in Les Apprentis. In 2007, he began rebuilding his career with the films Don't Touch the Axe (Ne Touchez Pas La Hache) and La France, and starred in the 2008 film De la guerre.

Personal life
Depardieu had a relationship with actress Clotilde Courau from 1997 to 1999, then married actress Elise Ventre on 30 December 1999.  They had a daughter, and separated in 2001. Depardieu was known to have had a strained relationship with his famous father, which he detailed in his 2004 autobiography Tout Donner (Giving Everything).  Depardieu was said to have reconciled with his father shortly before his death.

Guillaume was often called an enfant terrible by the French magazine Paris Match and was called eccentric and bohemian by others.  By 1993, he had already served two jail sentences for drug offences, which included dealing heroin and theft.  In 2003, he was fined and given a nine-month suspended prison sentence for threatening a man with a gun.  In 2008, he was arrested for driving his scooter while intoxicated.

In 1995, Depardieu crashed on his motorcycle when he ran over a suitcase that had fallen off a car and onto the roadway.  He underwent surgery to repair damage to his knee.  The wound developed a Staphylococcus aureus infection.  Doctors performed seventeen subsequent operations in an attempt to clear the infection and save the leg; however, these efforts were unsuccessful, and Depardieu's leg was amputated above the knee in June 2003.

Death
Depardieu's health was compromised by drug addiction and by his 1995 motorcycle accident and subsequent surgeries. He contracted a severe viral pneumonia while filming The Childhood of Icarus (L'Enfance d'Icare). He was unable to overcome the infection, and on 13 October 2008, died at the hospital in Garches, aged 37.

Filmography

Cinema

TV 
 Le Comte de Monte-Cristo (1999)
 Les Misérables (2000)
 Napoleon (2002)
 Les Rois maudits (2005) as Louis, King of Navarre
 Château en Suède (2008)

Discography
 Post Mortem (2013)

References

External links

1971 births
2008 deaths
Male actors from Paris
Most Promising Actor César Award winners
Deaths from pneumonia in France
French amputees
French male film actors
20th-century French male actors
21st-century French male actors
Guillaume